The Dalle Molle Institute for Artificial Intelligence Research (IDSIA) is a research institution based in Lugano, in  Canton Ticino in southern Switzerland. It was founded in 1988 by Angelo Dalle Molle through the private Fondation Dalle Molle. In 2000 it became a public research institute, affiliated with the Università della Svizzera italiana and SUPSI in Ticino, Switzerland. In 1997 it was listed among the top ten artificial intelligence laboratories, and among the top four in the field of biologically-inspired AI.

In 2007 a robotics lab with focus on intelligent and learning robots, especially in the fields of swarm and humanoid robotics, was established.

Between 2009 and 2012, artificial neural networks developed at the institute won eight international competitions in pattern recognition and machine learning.

IDSIA is one of four Swiss research organisations founded by the Dalle Molle foundation, of which three are in the field of artificial intelligence.

See also 
 Science and technology in Switzerland

References 

Artificial intelligence laboratories
Laboratories in Switzerland
Research institutes in Switzerland
University of Lugano
Schools in the canton of Ticino
Educational institutions established in 1988
Research institutes established in 1988
1988 establishments in Switzerland